Tınaz Tırpan (born 28 April 1939 in Turkey) is a former coach of the Turkey national football team, Kayserispor and Fenerbahçe SK.

Tırpan was appointed as Turkey coach in 1988, succeeding Mustafa Denizli. Under him, the Turks came very close to qualifying for the 1990 World Cup, but missed out qualification when they lost their final game 2–0 to the USSR.

After his spell in charge of Turkey, Tırpan was appointed Fenerbahçe SK coach, but lasted only five weeks in the job.

He then coached Ankaragücü in the 1999–2000 season, and steered them to UEFA Cup qualification.

Tırpan then took a break from football for two years. In 2002, he was appointed coach of Bucheon SK in South-Korea. His stay lasted only for one season because of poor results.

Managing career
 Turkish national football team 1988-1989
 Fenerbahçe SK 1990
 Ankaragücü 1999
 Bucheon SK 2002-2003

External links
 Tınaz Tırpan coaching stats

References

Turkish football managers
Fenerbahçe football managers
Turkey national football team managers
Jeju United FC managers
Boluspor managers
1939 births
Living people
Expatriate football managers in South Korea